Henk Hoekstra  (17 June 1924, Amsterdam - 10 April 2009) was a Dutch politician. In the years 1968 to 1982 he served as the chair of the Communist Party of the Netherlands.

See also
List of Dutch politicians

1924 births
2009 deaths
Politicians from Amsterdam
Chairmen of the Communist Party of the Netherlands